Adamo Coulibaly (born 14 August 1981) is a French professional footballer who plays as a forward for French club Noisy-Le-Grand FC in the Championnat National 3.

Club career

Debrecen
Coulibaly was signed before Debrecen's 2009–10 UEFA Champions League campaign. In the 2009–10 season, he won both the league and cup with Debrecen. The cup was secured by beating Zalaegerszegi TE 3–2 in the Hungarian Cup final in the Puskás Ferenc Stadium. He also earned the Hungarian Super Cup and Hungarian League Cup in the same season.

Coulibaly again won the double with Debrecen in the 2011–12 season. On 1 May 2012, he won the cup by defeating MTK Budapest on penalty shoot-out. This was the fifth cup for Debrecen. On 12 May 2012, he won the league title with Debrecen after beating Pécs 4–0 in the 28th round at the Oláh Gábor utcai Stadion which resulted the sixth Hungarian League title for the Hajdús. On 26 May 2012, he scored a penalty against Szombathely, reaching his 20th goal and overtaking Nemanja Nikolić in the topscorer ranking to become the top-scorer of season.

On 23 May 2013, Coulibaly won the Hungarian League title with Debrecen after scoring both of the club's goals in a 2–1 win against Győr in the final. On 2 June 2013, he again reached the title as the top-scorer of 2012–13 season, this time with 18 goals.

Debrecen (return)
On 4 November 2015, Coulibaly signed a contract with his former club Debreceni VSC. At the end of the season, in May 2016 the club decided not use the option of renewing the contract.

R.F.C. Tilleur
After a half year without club, Coulibaly joined RFC Tilleur in January 2017.

Balmazújváros
After training with Balmazújvárosi FC for two months, Coulibaly came in shape and the club decided to offer him a contract for the rest of the season on 26 October 2017. However, two weeks later it appeared, that the papers the parties had been waiting for, wouldn't arrive. The French striker forgot to tell the team management that he had an amateur contract in Belgium, which means that under international transfer rules he could only be contracted during the transfer window. The club announced, that Coulibaly was welcome to train with the team until January where he could get registered. The club then announced in January 2018, that they were not planning to contract him anymore.

Noisy-Le-Grand
On 19 September 2019, 39-year old Coulibaly joined French club Noisy-Le-Grand FC in the Championnat National 3 together with former professional player Christian Kinkela.

Career statistics

Honours

Club
Debrecen
 Hungarian League: 2009–10, 2011–12
 Hungarian Cup: 2009–10, 2011–12, 2012–13
 Hungarian Super Cup: 2009, 2010
 Hungarian League Cup: 2009–10

Individual
 Top scorer of the Hungarian League: 2011–12, 2012–13
: 2013

References

External links
 Profile at weltfussball 
 
 Profile at Voetbal International
 
 Adamo Coulibaly at HLSZ
 

1981 births
Living people
French sportspeople of Malian descent
Footballers from Paris
French footballers
Association football forwards
AS Poissy players
Sint-Truidense V.V. players
Royal Antwerp F.C. players
RC Lens players
Debreceni VSC players
R.F.C. Tilleur players
Belgian Pro League players
Challenger Pro League players
Ligue 1 players
Ligue 2 players
Nemzeti Bajnokság I players
Championnat National 3 players
French expatriate footballers
Expatriate footballers in Belgium
Expatriate footballers in Hungary
French expatriate sportspeople in Belgium
French expatriate sportspeople in Hungary